The 2016 MTV EMAs (also known as the MTV Europe Music Awards) were held at the Rotterdam Ahoy in Rotterdam, Netherlands, on 6 November 2016. It was hosted by Bebe Rexha. This was the third time the awards have taken place in the Netherlands, and the second time Rotterdam has been the host city. The awards were held in the same venue as the 1997 MTV EMAs.

Nominations
The nominations were announced on September 27, 2016. Winners are in bold text.

Regional nominations
Winners are in bold text.

Europe

Africa

Asia

Australia and New Zealand

Latin America

North America

Performances

Pre show

Main show

Appearances

Pre show
Laura Whitmore and Sway Calloway — Red carpet hosts
Laura Whitmore — Presented Biggest Fans
Laura Whitmore and The MTV It Girls — Presented Best Look

Main show
G-Eazy and Charli XCX — presented Best Electronic
Winnie Harlow and Tinie Tempah — presented Best Live
Jourdan Dunn — presented Best Male
Jaden Smith — presented Best New Act
Nina Dobrev and Deepika Padukone — presented Best Video
Idris Elba — presented Global Icon

Voting process

(*)without Best Acts from Netherlands, Belgium, Switzerland, Israel and Poland. In those countries voting was ended earlier.

See also
2016 MTV Video Music Awards

References

External links
Official website 

mtv
Music in Rotterdam
2016
2016 in the Netherlands